Dominika Leśniewicz-Smereka (born 13 January 1974) is a retired Polish volleyball and beach volleyball player, who played as a libero.

She was part of the Poland women's national volleyball team at the 2002 FIVB Volleyball Women's World Championship in Germany. On club level she played with Palac Bydgoszcz.

She played beach volleyball with Izabela Rutkowska in 2000.

Clubs
 Palac Bydgoszcz (2002)

References

External links
fivb.ch 
fivb.org

1974 births
Living people
Polish women's volleyball players
Place of birth missing (living people)